Antonio Giovanni Pollarolo  (12 November 1676 — 30 May 1746) was an Italian composer of the Baroque period, keyboardist, and maestro di cappella at St Mark's Basilica in Venice. As a composer he is primarily remembered for his operas, although his composition output also included cantatas, oratorios, and motets. A precursor to 19th century bel canto opera composers like Gioachino Rossini and Gaetano Donizetti, his vocal writing was written in a virtuosic manner characterized by florid coloratura passages, wide vocal range, lively tempos, and syncopated rhythms.

Life and career
Born in Brescia into the Pollarolo family of musicians, Antonio's father was the opera composer and organist Carlo Francesco Pollarolo. He was trained as a musician by his father and Antonio Lotti. At the age of 13 he moved with his family to Venice when his father was appointed vicemaestro di cappella at St Mark's Basilica. Antonio occasionally substituted for his father in this position, beginning in 1702, and later succeeded his father in the post in 1723. He later succeeded Lotti in the higher position of primo maestro at that cathedral in 1740; a post he held until his death six years later. He concurrently served as maestro di Coro at the Venice Conservatory while working at St Mark's Basilica; a post he was first elected to in 1716. 

Pollarolo's first opera, L’Aristeo, was staged in Venice in 1700. This was followed by the operas Griselda (1701) and Demetrio e Tolomeo (1702). After this came a period devoted mainly to sacred music, and his next opera, Nerone fatto Cesare, was not staged until 1715. His other operas include Nerone fatto Cesare (Venice, 1715), Venceslao (Venice, 1721), Cosröe (1723, Rome), and I tre voti (1724, Vienna).

Pollarolo was married twice. He had three children with his first wife who died in 1709. He married a second time in 1712, and had four more children from this second relationship. He died in Venice in 1746.

References

1676 births
1746 deaths
Italian Baroque composers
Italian male classical composers
Italian opera composers